The 2008 North America 4 is the third tournament between the North America 4 teams. Each of the four teams played each other three times in round-robin play, followed by semi-finals, a final and third-place play-off.

Teams
The teams competing are Canada East and Canada West, and the USA Falcons and USA Hawks. Each team was founded in 2005 by the NA4 committee, comprising the IRB, Rugby Canada and USA Rugby.

Canada West

Coached by Tony Medina, who is assisted by Ian Hyde-Lay, Canada West won the inaugural competition. Captained by scrum-half Ed Fairhust the team won their first match 98-0, the largest win of the competition. Fairhurst has represented Canada at test level, as well, the team has a front row with test experience.

Canada East

Coached by Simon Blanks, with assistants Jeff Prince and Greg Thaggard, Canada East finished third in 2006 after winning the consolation final. The team was captained by Derek Daypuck who also finished their leading points scorer on 78.

USA Falcons

Coached by Jim Love who is assisted by Kevin Battle. Their captain was Patrick Bell. The team finished runners-up after losing the competition final.

USA Hawks

They are coached by Pete Steinberg, assisted by Bernie Hogan and Gordon Macpherson. The team finished last in the competition. They finished with one win from their seven matches.

Round-Robin Standings

Round-Robin Play Schedule

Elimination Play Schedule

References

External links
Official website

2008
2008 rugby union tournaments for clubs
2008 in Canadian rugby union
2008 in American rugby union
2008 in North American rugby union